Pinion is a round gear, usually to the smaller of two meshed gears.

Pinion may also refer to:

Birds 
 Pinion (feather), an outermost primary flight feather on a bird's wing
 Pinioning, the act of surgically removing a bird's pinion joint

People 
 Bradley Pinion (born 1994), American football punter
 Joe Pinion (born 1983), American politician
 Offutt Pinion (1924–1961), American sport shooter

Places 
 Pinion, Arizona
 Pinion Rock

Taxonomy 
 Pinyon (or pinion, piñon), a group of pines
 Pinion (moth), a number of moths mostly in the family Noctuidae

Other uses 
 "Pinion", an instrumental song by Nine Inch Nails from the 1992 EP Broken